Critical thermal maximum, in zoology, is the temperature for a given species above which most individuals respond with unorganized locomotion, subjecting the animal to likely death. This concept is particularly relevant in periods of aestivation or quiescence, in which circumstances an organism experiences limited mobility and lacks the ability to seek a microhabitat of reduced thermal stress.

See also
 Aestivation
 Physiology
 Torpor

Line notes

References
 Roy W. McDiarmid and Ronald Altig (1999) Tadpoles: The Biology of Anuran Larvae, p 202, University of Chicago Press  

Animal physiology